Argentina competed at the 2012 Winter Youth Olympics in Innsbruck, Austria. The Argentine team was made up of five athletes in three sports.

Alpine skiing

Argentina qualified a team of one boys and one girl.

Boys

Girls

Cross country skiing

Argentina qualified one boy in cross country skiing.

Boys

Sprint

Freestyle skiing

Argentina qualified one boy and one girl for the ski cross events.

Ski Cross

Boy

Girl

See also
Argentina at the 2012 Summer Olympics

References

2012 in Argentine sport
Nations at the 2012 Winter Youth Olympics
Argentina at the Youth Olympics